Sequoia Middle School can refer to one of several middle schools in California:

 Sequoia Middle School (Fontana, California)
 Sequoia Middle School (Newbury Park, California)
 Sequoia Middle School (Pleasant Hill, California)
 Sequoia Middle School (Redding, California)